Ixora pavetta, the torch tree, is a plant in the family Rubiaceae. This species is found in South Asia. The species is commonly seen in Ballari district of Karnataka, India. It is called as goravi (ಗೊರವಿ) in Kannada. People use the branches of this tree for making walls and paste with mud for their thatched huts in villages, but now this practice has become obsolete owing to modern housing materials.

Summer is the fruiting season and the fruits are globose, 2-seeded,  become black when ripened.  Indian sloth bears eat the fruits  and the seeds are dispersed through its scat.

References

pavetta
Taxa named by Henry Cranke Andrews